Stojan Ignatov (born 22 December 1979) is a Macedonian retired football midfielder.

Club career
He finished his career at FK Teteks. He played for Ethnikos Achna FC in Cyprus.

International career
He made his senior debut for Macedonia in a July 2001 friendly match against Qatar and has earned a total of 11 caps, scoring no goals. His final international was a September 2005 FIFA World Cup qualification match against Finland.

Honours and awards
FK Sileks Kratovo
First Macedonian Football League: 1
Runner-up:1998–99
FK Rabotnički Skopje
First Macedonian Football League: 2
Winner: 2004–05, 2005–06

References

External links
 
Profile at TFF.org

1979 births
Living people
People from Probištip
Association football midfielders
Macedonian footballers
North Macedonia youth international footballers
North Macedonia under-21 international footballers
North Macedonia international footballers
FK Sileks players
Samsunspor footballers
FK Rabotnički players
Beijing Guoan F.C. players
FC Politehnica Iași (1945) players
Ethnikos Achna FC players
FK Metalurg Skopje players
FK Teteks players
Macedonian First Football League players
Süper Lig players
Cypriot First Division players
Liga I players
Macedonian Second Football League players
Macedonian expatriate footballers
Expatriate footballers in Turkey
Macedonian expatriate sportspeople in Turkey
Expatriate footballers in China
Macedonian expatriate sportspeople in China
Expatriate footballers in Romania
Macedonian expatriate sportspeople in Romania
Expatriate footballers in Cyprus
Macedonian expatriate sportspeople in Cyprus